Richard Fitzpatrick (1880 – November 1, 1904) was a top gunman in the Monk Eastman gang in New York City. He had defected from the Five Points Gang in the early 1900s; he was active during the late 1890s until his murder in 1904.

Fitzpatrick had joined the Five Points Gang under Paul Kelly (born Paolo Antonio Vaccarelli) in the late 1890s. During the Kelly-Eastman gang war in 1903, Fitzpatrick defected to the Eastman Gang, along with "Kid Twist" Max Zwerbach; they both became top lieutenants. After Monk Eastman was arrested and imprisoned in 1904, Fitzpatrick and Zwerbach began fighting over leadership of the Eastman gang, eventually splitting the gang into separate factions.

On November 1, 1904, while attending a peace conference at a Sheriff Street saloon in the New York Chrystie Street neighborhood, Fitzpatrick was shot to death before the peace talks began. His killer was suspected of being Harris Dahl, aka Kid Dahl, friend of arch-rival Kid Twist. Several weeks later, "Kid Twist" lieutenant Vach "Cyclone Louie" Lewis led an attack that resulted in the murders of the remainder of the Fitzpatrick faction.

Popular culture
Fitzpatrick was said to use a strategy of ambushing opponents by setting up meetings and claiming to be ready to turn against his leader. After being searched, he would excuse himself to use the restroom, where he had stashed a gun. Returning to the main room, he would kill his opponent. Such a tactic was used by Al Pacino's character Michael Corleone in The Godfather.

References
Asbury, Herbert. The Gangs of New York. New York: Alfred A. Knopf, 1928. 
English, T.J. Paddy Whacked: The Untold Story of the Irish American Gangster. New York: HarperCollins, 2005. 
Sifakis, Carl. The Encyclopedia of American Crime. New York: Facts on File Inc., 2001.

Further reading
Fried, Albert. The Rise and Fall of the Jewish Gangster in America. New York: Holt, Rinehart and Winston, 1980. 
O'Kane, James M. The Crooked Ladder. New Brunswick, New Jersey: Transaction Publishers, 1994. 

1880 births
1904 deaths
American gangsters
Gangsters from New York City
Criminals from Manhattan
Eastman Gang
Five Points Gang
People murdered in New York City
Male murder victims
Deaths by firearm in Manhattan
Murdered American gangsters of Irish descent